Saghira (Arabic for little girl) is a Muslim doll that was created as an alternative to other mainstream dolls which usually are made in western countries. Saghira is now a 17 and half inch doll that is available in North Africa, parts of Europe and the Middle East.

Manufacturer 
Saghira was created by a Moroccan manufacturer SAGHIRA SARL between the years 2005 and 2006 and started selling in the Morocco market in January 2007.

Models 
Saghira comes now in just one model. Previously Saghira came under different model names but as this proved difficult to market, Saghira's company decided to concentrate on its core model only. Previous models were called Amira (princess), Doaa (Prayer), Aya, Abir, Ahd, Shada, Nada, Dahab, Najma, Nour. These may actually be brought back in future years when Saghira establishes more of a name for itself.

Attire and accessories 
Saghira's attires are a mix of both authentic traditional clothing as well as Western clothes. All but the western versions of Saghira come with doll accessories based on articles usually found in Arabic and Muslim homes. Saghira comes with veiled and unveiled models. Usually unveiled models depict Saghira within her home or in a family environment.

See also
 Fulla (doll)
 Jamila (doll)
 Barbie
 Razanne

External links
 Saghira

Fashion dolls
Products introduced in 2007